Laila Ali Abdulla is a Maldivian activist and First Lady of the Maldives from 11 November 2008 until 7 February 2012. She is the wife of the fourth president of the second Republic of the Maldives, Mohamed Nasheed and mother of two girls Meera Laila Nasheed & Zaaya Laila Nasheed.

Activism Work 
Abdulla's husband, Mohammed Nasheed, was the Maldives first democratically elected president (2008–2012). In 2014, Nasheed was found guilty of terrorism on false charges and sentenced to 13 years in prison. Ali Abdulla worked alongside Nasheed's lawyer, Amal Clooney, to get his charges overturned.

On 24 March 2015 Ms. Ali Abdulla held a press conference in which she asked Indian Prime Minister Narendra Modi to intervene in her husband's case so that he can be released from jail. In a phone interview with the media she said,  "I do not know what it will take PM Modi to do it but my wish is that India helps in ensuring that my husband is freed unconditionally and that representative democracy is restored. How India does it is for the PM to decide",

On 30 June 2015, Abdulla held a Press Club Newsmaker urging for her husband's release, stating that he was under solitary confinement throughout his detention.

In January 2016, Mr. Nasheed was allowed to leave the Maldives through an internationally brokered deal. On 23 January 2016, Ali Abdulla accompanied her husband and his lawyer, Amal Clooney, to meet with British Prime Minister David Cameron to discuss Mr. Nasheed's case.

References

External Links 

   

First ladies of the Maldives
Maldivian activists
Living people
People from Malé
Maldivian Muslims
Year of birth missing (living people)